Apolipoprotein C-III also known as apo-CIII, and apolipoprotein C3, is a protein that in humans is encoded by the APOC3 gene. Apo-CIII is secreted by the liver as well as the small intestine, and is found on triglyceride-rich lipoproteins such as chylomicrons, very low density lipoprotein (VLDL), and remnant cholesterol.

Structure 

ApoC-III is a relatively small protein containing 79 amino acids that can be glycosylated at threonine-74. The most abundant glycoforms are characterized by an O-linked disaccharide galactose linked to N-acetylgalactosamine (Gal- GalNAc), further modified with up to 2 sialic acid residues. Less abundant glycoforms are characterized by more complex and fucosylated glycan moieties.

Function 

APOC3 inhibits lipoprotein lipase and hepatic lipase; it is thought to inhibit hepatic uptake of triglyceride-rich particles. The APOA1, APOC3 and APOA4 genes are closely linked in both rat and human genomes. The A-I and A-IV genes are transcribed from the same strand, while the A-1 and C-III genes are convergently transcribed. An increase in apoC-III levels induces the development of hypertriglyceridemia.
Recent evidences suggest an intracellular role for Apo-CIII in promoting the assembly and secretion of triglyceride-rich VLDL particles from hepatic cells under lipid-rich conditions. However, two naturally occurring point mutations in human apoC3 coding sequence, namely Ala23Thr and Lys58Glu have been shown to abolish the intracellular assembly and secretion of triglyceride-rich VLDL particles from hepatic cells.

Clinical significance 

Overexpression of Apo-CIII in humans contributes to atherosclerosis. Two novel susceptibility haplotypes (specifically, P2-S2-X1 and P1-S2-X1) have been discovered in ApoAI-CIII-AIV gene cluster on chromosome 11q23; these confer approximately threefold higher risk of coronary heart disease in normal as well as non-insulin diabetes mellitus.  In persons with type 2 diabetes, elevated plasma Apo-CIII is associated with higher plasma triglycerides and greater coronary artery calcification (a measure of subclinical atherosclerosis).

Apo-CIII delays the catabolism of triglyceride rich particles. HDL cholesterol particles that bear Apo-CIII are associated with increased, rather than decreased, risk for coronary heart disease.

Elevations of Apo-CIII found in genetic variation studies may predispose patients to non-alcoholic fatty liver disease.

Interactive pathway map

Apolipoprotein CIII and HDL
Apolipoprotein CIII is also found on HDL particles. Formation of APOCIII-containing HDL is not a matter of simple binding of APOCII to pre-existing HDL particles but requires the lipid transported ABCA1 in a fashion similar to APOA1-containing HDL. Accumulation of APOCIII on HDL is important for the maintenance of plasma triglyceride homeostasis since it prevents excessive amount of APOCIII on VLDL and other triglyceride rich lipoproteins, thus preventing APOCIII-mediated inhibition of LpL and the subsequent hydrolysis of plasma triglycerides. This may explain the hypertriglyceridemia associated with ABCA1-deficiency in patients with Tangier's disease.

References

External links

Further reading 

 
 
 
 
 
 
 
 
 
 
 
 
 
 
 
 
 
 
 
 

Apolipoproteins